List of colleges and universities in Washington may refer to:

 List of colleges and universities in Washington (state)
 List of colleges and universities in Washington, D.C.